The 15559 / 15560 Darbhanga–Ahmedabad Antyodaya Express is a fully unreserved Express train of the Indian Railways for connecting  in Bihar and  in Gujarat. It is currently being operated with 15559/15560 train numbers on once in week.

This train was started as Jan Sadharan Express on 04 Feb 2015 with the rake zone of Western Railway, It has become popular for direct connectivity to East and West part of India with lower rates. Till 4 years it gave service. Later, after approval for a more comfortable journey from Ministry of Railways of India, it was converted into Antyodaya Express and also the Rake zone was also transferred to East Central Railway zone.

Service
It covers the distance of 2016 km with an average speed of 50 km/h on both sides.

Route & halts
The important halts of the train are :
 Darbhanga Junction
 
 
 
 
 
 
 
 
 
 
 
 
 
 
 
 
 
 
 
 
 Ahmedabad Junction

Coach composite 

The train consists of 22 coaches:

 16 General
 2 Second-class Luggage/parcel van

Traction

As the route is yet to be fully electrified, it is hauled by a Samastipur Diesel Loco Shed-based WDM-3D or WDM-3A locomotive from Darbhanga up to Itarsi handing over to an Itarsi Electric Loco Shed-based WAP-4 locomotive for the remainder of the journey until Ahmedabad.

Direction reversal

The train reverses its direction 2 times:

See also 

 Sabarmati Express
 Ahmedabad–Darbhanga Sabarmati Express

References

External links
15559/Darbhanga - Ahmedabad Jansadharan Weekly Express India Rail Info
15560/Ahmedabad - Darbhanga Jansadharan Weekly Express India Rail Info

Rail transport in Gujarat
Rail transport in Madhya Pradesh
Rail transport in Uttar Pradesh
Rail transport in Bihar
Transport in Ahmedabad
Transport in Darbhanga
Antyodaya Express trains